Världens bästa Karlsson is a Swedish family film which was released to cinemas in Sweden on 2 December 1974, directed by Olle Hellbom. It is based on a book about Karlsson-on-the-Roof by Astrid Lindgren.

Cast 

 Lars Söderdahl as Svante 'Lillebror' Svantesson
 Mats Wikström as Karlsson
 Jan Nygren as Karlsson (voice)
 Catrin Westerlund as Lillebror's Mother
 Stig Ossian Ericson as Lillebror's Father
 Staffan Hallerstam as Bosse Svantesson
 Britt Marie Näsholm as Bettan Svantesson
 Nils Lagergren as Krister
 Maria Selander as Gunilla
 Pär Kjellin as Pelle
 Janne 'Loffe' Carlsson as Fille

References

External links 

1974 films
Films based on works by Astrid Lindgren
Films directed by Olle Hellbom
Swedish fantasy films
1970s Swedish-language films
Swedish children's films
1970s Swedish films